Derbyshire County Cricket Club in 1921 represents the cricket season when the English club Derbyshire had been playing for fifty years. It was their twenty-third season in the County Championship and they won five matches to finish twelfth.

1921 season 

After the appalling results of 1920, George Buckston returned as captain at the age of 40 with the firm purpose of reviving a dispirited eleven. Buckston had not played county cricket since 1907, but his appointment was followed by a revival in Derbyshire fortunes.  Derbyshire CCC played twenty games in the County Championship in 1921 and won five, to finish twelfth in the table. They also played a match against Dublin University on 16 July 1921, which was a win for Derbyshire by an innings and 133 runs and an additional match against Leicestershire.  W T Taylor wrote of Buckston that "Only those who played under him knew how much the team owed to the skipper for his example, cheerfulness and leadership". Having achieved his aim,  Buckston could not be persuaded to carry on. Instead, he was elected chairman of the Committee.

Billy Bestwick was fourth in the national first-class bowling averages with 147 wickets for less than 17 runs each. He took 10 for 40 in an innings against Glamorgan at Cardiff and took five or more wickets in an innings in all but two matches. Samuel Cadman was top scorer.

With a considerable amount of new blood in 1920, there were no lasting additions to the Derbyshire side in 1921. John Fisher only played in two seasons and George Goodwin in just one season.  George Buckley and Herbert Turland made one appearance each for the side, although Turland later played in a match for Nottinghamshire.

Additional players who appeared for the club in the Dublin University match were Geoffrey Bell and  players called Dilnot and Freeman.

Matches
{| class="wikitable" style="width:100%;"
|-
! style="background:#efefef;" colspan="6"| List of  matches
|- style="background:#efefef;"
!No.
!Date
!V
!Result 
!Margin
!Notes
|- 
|1
|14 May 1921 
| Warwickshire   Edgbaston, Birmingham 
| style="background:#f00;"|Lost
|8 Wickets
|  W Bestwick 9-65; Howell 8-69
 |- 
|2
|18 May 1921 
| Worcestershire  County Ground, New Road, Worcester  
| style="background:#0f0;"|Won
|8 Wickets
|  A Morton 5-108, W Bestwick 7-67
|- 
|3
|21 May 1921 
| Nottinghamshire  Queen's Park, Chesterfield 
| style="background:#0f0;"|Won
|23 Runs
|  Barratt 5-68 and 5-39; Richmond 5-58; W Bestwick 5-82; A Morton 5-49 and 8-69
|- 
|4
|25 May 1921 
| Essex  County Ground, Leyton 
| style="background:#f00;"|Lost
|Innings and 74 runs 
|  JWHT Douglas 210 and 9-47; W Bestwick 6-132
|-
|5
 |01 Jun 1921 
| Yorkshire   The Circle, Hull 
| style="background:#f00;"|Lost
|Innings and 112 runs 
|  Derbyshire all out for 23 in second innings; E Robinson 100; Macaulay 6-3; W Bestwick 7-84 
|- 
|6
|11 Jun 1921 
| Somerset  Recreation Ground, Bath 
| style="background:#f00;"|Lost
|65 runs
|  W Bestwick 8-84 and 5-66; Robson 5-58; White 6-57
|- 
|7
|15 Jun 1921 
| Gloucestershire  Fry's Ground, Bristol 
| style="background:#f00;"|Lost
|117 runs
|  Barnett 100; Dipper 104; J Bowden 108;Mills 5-51; Parker 5-121
|- 
|8
|18 Jun 1921 
| Glamorgan   Cardiff Arms Park 
| style="background:#0f0;"|Won
|2 Wickets
|  W Bestwick 10-40
|- 
|9
|22 Jun 1921 
| Somerset   County Ground, Derby 
| style="background:#f00;"|Lost
|6 Wickets
|  White 5-56 and 8-120
|- 
|10
|25 Jun 1921 
| Worcestershire  Queen's Park, Chesterfield  
| style="background:#f00;"|Lost
|6 Wickets
|  Pearson 106; W Bestwick 7-120; Gilbert 5-49
|- 
|11
|06 Jul 1921 
| Gloucestershire  County Ground, Derby
| style="background:#f00;"|Lost
|97 runs
|  W Bestwick 5-68; Samuel Cadman 5-20; Dennett 8-61; Parker 6-50
|- 
|12
|09 Jul 1921 
|Northamptonshire  County Ground, Derby
| style="background:#f00;"|Lost
|194 runs
|  W Bestwick 5-99 and 6-94; Murdin 6-87; Wells 5-30
|- 
|13
|13 Jul 1921 
| Yorkshire   Queen's Park, Chesterfield 
| style="background:#f00;"|Lost
|Innings and 233 runs
|  Derbyshire out for 37 in first innings; Holmes 150; Robinson 5-16; Samuel Cadman 5-74; Macaulay 6-32
|- 
|14
|20 Jul 1921 
| Nottinghamshire  Town Ground, Worksop
| style="background:#f00;"|Lost
|48 runs
| Richmond 5-89
 |- 
|15
|30 Jul 1921 
| Warwickshire  County Ground, Derby  
| style="background:#fc0;"|Drawn
|
|L Oliver151; H Storer 126; W Bestwick 5-68  
|- 
|16
|03 Aug 1921 
| Northamptonshire  County Ground, Northampton
| style="background:#fc0;"|Drawn
|
|  Murdin 5-89; W Bestwick 8-82; Thomas 5-59
|- 
|17
|06 Aug 1921 
| Leicestershire  Queen's Park, Chesterfield
| style="background:#0f0;"|Won
|172 runs
|  Astill 6-64; W Bestwick 7-39
|- 
|18
|10 Aug 1921 
| Essex  County Ground, Derby  
| style="background:#fc0;"|Drawn
|
|  A Morton 5-46
|- 
|19
|13 Aug 1921 
| Leicestershire  Aylestone Road, Leicester  
| style="background:#f00;"|Lost
|Innings and 24 runs
|  Astill 108; W Bestwick 6-73; Banskin 7-48
|- 
|20
|20 Aug 1921 
| Glamorgan   Queen's Park, Chesterfield
| style="background:#0f0;"|Won
|3 Wickets
| Nash 5-58; W Bestwick 5-79; Clay 5-37
|

Statistics

County Championship batting averages

County Championship bowling averages

Wicket Keeper
H Elliott - Catches  30, Stumping 7

See also
Derbyshire County Cricket Club seasons
1921 English cricket season

References

1921 in English cricket
Derbyshire County Cricket Club seasons
English cricket seasons in the 20th century